Body of Proof was an American medical drama television series that ran from March 29, 2011 to May 28, 2013 on ABC. It was created by Chris Murphey and produced by ABC Studios. It mainly focuses around Dana Delany's character Megan Hunt.

Series overview

Episode list

Season 1 (2011)

Season 2 (2011–12)

Season 3 (2013)

Webisodes

Outbreak

References

External links 

Lists of American comedy-drama television series episodes
Episodes